Wan is a village in the Sialkot District in the Punjab province of Pakistan, situated between Daska, Sambrial and Wazirabad.

Villages in Sialkot District

 Nala Aik cuts this from outer banks.